Filipino singer Regine Velasquez has released seventeen studio albums, eight soundtrack albums, one live album, fifteen compilation albums, five extended plays (EPs), ninety singles (including nine as featured artist), and twenty-two promotional singles. In 1984, she won the television talent competition Ang Bagong Kampeon and was signed to a record deal with OctoArts International. She released her first single, "Love Me Again", in 1986, under the name Chona. After adopting the stage name Regine Velasquez, she signed with Viva Records in 1987 and released her debut studio album, Regine, that spawned three singles—"Kung Maibabalik Ko Lang", "Urong Sulong", and "Isang Lahi". In December 1989, she represented the Philippines at the Asia-Pacific Singing Contest, performing the songs "You'll Never Walk Alone" and "And I Am Telling You I'm Not Going", and won the competition. Her subsequent studio albums Nineteen 90 (1989) and Tagala Talaga (1991) featured the singles "Narito Ako" and "Buhay Ng Buhay Ko", respectively. A cover version of "It's Hard to Say Goodbye" with Paul Anka became the lead single for her fourth studio album, Reason Enough, which was released in July 1993.

After Velasquez signed with PolyGram in 1994, she released her fifth studio album, Listen Without Prejudice, in countries including China, Hong Kong, Indonesia, Malaysia, Singapore, Taiwan, and Thailand. It featured the lead single "In Love With You", a duet with Jacky Cheung.  The album has sold 700,000 copies in Asia, making it the best-selling album of her career to date. Two more studio albums were released in the region, My Love Emotion (1995) and Retro (1997). In 1998, Velasquez parted with PolyGram and signed with Los Angeles-based producer Mark J. Feist MJF Company. Her ninth studio album, Drawn, was released in November 1998 and includes the singles "How Could You Leave" and "Ikaw". The next year, she released her tenth studio album, R2K (1999), which was subsequently certified twelve-times platinum by the Philippine Association of the Record Industry (PARI) and became the best-selling album by a female artist in the Philippines.

Velasquez released the soundtrack album Kailangan Ko'y Ikaw in July 2000. Its lead single served as the love theme of the motion picture of the same name. The album sold more than 240,000 copies and was certified six-times platinum. In October 2000, she released her first live album, Regine Live: Songbird Sings the Classics, a fifteen-piece setlist performed at the Westin Philippine Plaza in Manila. The singer's subsequent records—Covers. Vol 1 (2004),  (2006), Low Key (2008) and Fantasy (2010)—were all cover albums. Velasquez took a three-year break to record new material and introduced a gospel-inspired album Hulog Ka Ng Langit (2013), which includes the singles "Nathaniel (Gift of God)" and "Hele Ni Inay". Her seventeenth studio album, R3.0, was released in October 2017. Its singles, "Tadhana" and "Hugot", were released a month earlier.

Having sold more than seven million records in the Philippines and a further million and a half in other parts of Asia, Velasquez is the best-selling Filipino artist of all time. According to PARI, she is also the only Filipino artist to have eight of her albums exceed sales of 200,000 units each.

Albums

Studio albums

Live albums

Soundtrack albums

Compilation albums

Extended plays

Box sets

Singles

As lead artist

As featured artist

Promotional singles

See also
List of songs recorded by Regine Velasquez

Notes

References

Citations

Book sources

External links
 
 
 

Discographies of Filipino artists
Pop music discographies
Discography